SS Patrick B. Whalen was a Liberty ship built in the United States during World War II.

Construction
Patrick B. Whalen was laid down on 29 January 1945, under a Maritime Commission (MARCOM) contract, MC hull 2404, by J.A. Jones Construction, Brunswick, Georgia; she was sponsored by Mrs. Leo W. Regan, and launched on 15 March 1945.

History
She was allocated to the Isbrandtsen Steamship Co. Inc., on 30 March 1945. On 19 July 1949, she was sold to Atl. Marine Transport Co., for commercial use and renamed Christiam and later Bostonian and Manhattan. In April 1952, she was sold to National Transocean Carriers, Inc. In November 1952, she was sold to Phoenix Steamship Corp., and renamed Seadragon. In July 1953, she was sold to Navigator Steamship Corp., and renamed Charles C. Dunaif. In July 1958, she was sold to Cargo Ships & Tankers, Inc. In June 1961, she was sold to a Liberian shipping company and renamed Wilderness. On 4 May 1962, she was reflagged for the US. In March 1967, she was sold to Debbie Mae Shipping Corp., and renamed Debbie Mae. She was sold for scrapping in Taiwan in May 1967.

References

Bibliography

 
 
 
 
 

 

Liberty ships
Ships built in Brunswick, Georgia
1945 ships